Wembley Greyhounds was the greyhound racing operation held at Wembley Stadium in London.

History

Origins
After the 1924-25 British Empire Exhibition Wembley Stadium was in liquidation before eventually being purchased by Arthur Elvin. For the stadium to survive into the future it required much needed revenue and it was greyhound racing that provided it.

Opening
The first meeting was held on 10 December 1927 when 70,000 people witnessed the first ever winner called Spin claim the Empire Stakes over 525 yards. The Director of Racing and Racing Manager was Captain Arthur Brice, he was well known as the judge for the Waterloo Cup.

Pre war history
In 1928 the stadium introduced a major competition called the St Leger which became one of the most prominent classic races in the greyhound racing calendar ranking only lower than the English Greyhound Derby. The first ever running in 1928 was won by a local hound by the name of Burletta trained by Alf Mulliner. Over the following decades Wembley would become unrivalled in terms of major competition success and at times become almost dominant. Despite the success it was never seen as the spiritual home of greyhound racing because the White City Stadium which hosted the Derby took this honour and even after the closure of White City it was Walthamstow Stadium that took over the mantle.

Wembley attracted all of the sports greatest greyhounds and introduced further events called the Coronation Stakes in 1928 for bitches only, the Trafalgar Cup which started in 1929 and was as significant an event for puppies as was the Puppy Derby at the time, the Wembley Gold Cup in 1929, the Wembley Spring Cup in 1930 and the Wembley Summer Cup in 1937.

Mick the Miller won the 1930 Wembley Spring Stakes defeating a greyhound called Swashbuckler by a short head, Swashbuckler had won by 20 lengths in a race on the opening night and held five track records over all distances between 1928 and 1929. Mick the Miller successfully defended his title in 1931 culminating in a track record performance in the final and then claimed the St Leger later in the year.

Another star called Future Cutlet arrived on the track in 1931; he had come over from Ireland after being purchased for £600 by W.A. Evershed to race at Wembley Stadium; the Probert trained brindle dog became the first Derby winner for Wembley.

Arthur 'Doc' Callanan joined the training ranks in 1931 which included Alf Mulliner, Thomas Cudmore, Bob Burls, Sidney Probert and Jim Syder Sr. The track characteristics were described as a fast galloping track 463 yards in circumference with long straights and easy turns, it was also noted that the track was well kept and well turfed but the course was too rigorous for the smaller type of dog and an 'Inside MacWhirter Trackless' hare system was used. The greyhounds were kept on site in the grounds of the stadium with facilities found on the left hand side of the famous Twin Towers, they included six sets of kennels housing 300 greyhounds in total with incorporated kitchens, each had its own paddock area and they were situated next door to the racing and administration offices. In addition there were isolation kennels for sick greyhounds, a large training gallop a large paddock by the racing kennels, and a veterinary surgery. The racing kennels were only on race nights.

Two significant training appointments were made starting with Harry 'Jack' Harvey in 1936 and Leslie Reynolds three years later in 1939. The pair embarked on a series of competition wins that was the most successful in the industry for three decades.

1946-1950
In 1946 Bah's Choice an English bred greyhound trained by Bob Burls clocked 29.04 sec to set a new 525 yards world and track record. Under the leadership of Arthur Elvin the greyhound racing made very large profits in 1947 of £610,000 of which £343,000 was taken by the government in tax. The totalisator turnover was a £10,905,145 the equivalent of a staggering £411 million as of 2015.

1950s
In 1952 the track underwent changes, the circumference was shortened to 435 metres and the Inside MacWhirter Trackless hare system was replaced by an Outside McKee Scott. Three of the most well-known owners the all ran their greyhounds at Wembley; the trio of George Flintham, Noel Purvis and Norman Dupont purchased and owned many of the sports leading greyhounds. In 1953, which was the year Elvin died, 30,000 people watched the final of the St Leger with Magourna Reject and the race was screened on television. John Jolliffe had taken over as Racing Manager in the late 1940s and he recruited Jack Tetlow as his deputy.

During 1958 Pigalle Wonder recorded 28.78 sec at Wembley, a best time that stood for almost 20 years until the distance was changed to metres. Jim Syder Jr retired and Leslie Reynolds died with the latter leaving a legacy and record of training five Derby winners. Their replacements were  Jack Kinsley and Jimmy Rimmer.

1960s
In 1966 the government extended on course betting tax to all greyhound tracks. In the same year during the 1966 World Cup greyhound racing history was made when Wembley refused to cancel the greyhound meeting scheduled resulting in the Uruguay versus France fixture moving to be played at White City. In 1968 Jolliffe retired after a 37-year career, also retiring was the well respected trainer Ronnie Melville replaced by the Tom Johnston Jr.

1970s
The Wembley kennels were demolished in 1973 which forced some of the trainers to relocate. Jack Harvey, Bob Burls and Jack Kinsley all chose early retirement. Using a contract trainer system replacements included John Coleman from Romford Stadium and Wally Ginzel. Jack Tetlow also retired ending a 43-year association with the stadium to be replaced by a new Racing Manager called Ron Fraser.

Westpark Mustard trained by Tom Johnston Jr. embarked on a record run in 1974 and after sixteen successive wins she would race and win four times at Wembley to break Mick the Miller's existing record. In 1978 Peter Shotton took the role of head of racing at Wembley followed by his
assistant Jim Cremin who would later become editor of the Racing Post

1980s
An event called 'The Blue Riband' was introduced in 1981 which replaced the long running Spring Cup which had been one of the first major competitions in the greyhound racing calendar. The stadium hosted the only ever meeting between Ballyregan Bob and Scurlogue Champ in 1985, the invitation race saw Ballyregan Bob equal the Westpark Mustard's record but sadly Scurlogue Champ failed to finish after pulling up lame. A future BBC Television trophy winner Glenowen Queen finished second but 11¾ lengths adrift.

The Greyhound Racing Association GRA was taken over by Wembley plc in 1987 in a £68.5 million merger, meaning that the Wembley greyhound operation now came entirely under the GRA banner. John Rowley was the Wembley Racing Manager assisted by Peter Miller with trainers attached to the track being Ted Dickson, Pam Heasman, Adam Jackson, Wally Ginzel, John Honeysett, Tom Johnston Jr. and Hazel Walden.

1990s
By 1992 GRA parent company Wembley plc announced losses of £8 million despite a £13 million profit in its UK operation. Later the Wembley plc American greyhound operation saw profits fall from £5.9 to £3.3 million and the British tracks made a £2.1 million profit but Wembley plc was servicing a sizeable debt.

Closure
In 1998 during a very difficult spell the news arrived that the greyhound racing would end as plans were revealed for the stadium rebuild. The sport that had been responsible for the survival of the stadium for decades had not been included in the new plans. The last race was held on Friday 18 December 1998.

Competitions

St Leger

Trafalgar Cup

Wembley Spring Cup

Coronation Stakes

Blue Riband

Select Stakes

Wembley Gold Cup
The Wembley Gold Cup was a competition held from 1929 over the stayers distance until the stadium closed.

1929-1974 (700y), 1975-1980 (655m), 1981-1998 (710m)

Wembley Summer Cup
The Wembley Summer Cup was a competition held from 1937 over the standard distance until 1980.

1937-1974 (500y), 1975-1980 (490m)

Breeders Forum Stakes
The Breeders Forum Stakes was a competition held from 1972 over the standard distance.

(490m)

Empire Stadium Stakes
The Empire Hurdles Stakes was a competition held from 1930 over hurdles.

1930-1973 (700y H), 1974 (525y H), 1975-1997 (490m H), 1952-1960 (not held)

Track records

Pre-Metric

Post-Metric Track records

Wembley Greyhound Derby winners
1933	Future Cutlet
1937	Wattle Bark
1948	Priceless Border
1949	Narrogar Ann
1951	Ballylanigan Tanist
1952	Endless Gossip
1954	Pauls Fun
1958	Pigalle Wonder
1959	Mile Bush Pride

See also
Wembley Stadium (1923)

References

Greyhound racing in the United Kingdom
Wembley Stadium
Sport in the London Borough of Brent
Greyhound racing in London